Ignachevo is a rural locality (a village) in Novlenskoye Rural Settlement, Vologodsky District, Vologda Oblast, Russia. The population was 44 as of 2002.

Geography 
Ignachevo is located 75 km northwest of Vologda (the district's administrative centre) by road. Kostromino is the nearest rural locality.

References 

Rural localities in Vologodsky District